This is a list of members of the Tasmanian Legislative Council between 1963 and 1969. Terms of the Legislative Council did not coincide with Legislative Assembly elections, and members served six year terms, with a number of members facing election each year.

Elections

Members

Notes

  On 19 December 1965, William Fry, the member for Launceston, died. John Orchard won the resulting by-election on 29 January 1966.
  On 7 May 1968, Thomas d'Alton, the Labor member for Gordon, died. Alby Broadby won the resulting by-election on 26 June 1968.
  On 20 July 1968, Sir Henry Baker, the member for Queenborough, died. Louis Shoobridge won the resulting by-election on 28 September 1968, which was contested by 13 candidates — a record for the Legislative Council.
  In late 1968, John Orchard, the member for Launceston, was forced to vacate his seat under the Constitution (Disqualification Removal) Act 1968 due to his having been engaged in a contract with the government in his business affairs. Ray Shipp won the resulting by-election on 21 December 1968.

Sources
 
 Parliament of Tasmania (2006). The Parliament of Tasmania from 1856

Members of Tasmanian parliaments by term
20th-century Australian politicians